Jefferson Cristian dos Santos de Lima (born 1993 or 1994), known professionally as MC Bin Laden, is a Brazilian singer and songwriter. He is recognized as one of the most popular funk ostentação musicians in Brazil.

Early life
Jefferson Cristian dos Santos de Lima was born and raised in Vila Progresso, a neighborhood in the Itaquera district of São Paulo. His parents separated when he was nine years old. Before his musical career, dos Santos de Lima was a salesman on 25 de Março Street.

Career 
In late 2014, American DJ Skrillex included MC Bin Laden's song "Bololo Haha" on his Skrillex Selects playlist on SoundCloud. MC Bin Laden performed his song "Tá Tranquilo, Tá Favorável" on stage with Skrillex and Diplo at Lollapalooza Brasil in 2016. He had been denied entry visas to the United States twice in 2016.

É Grau, an extended play which collected six of MC Bin Laden's greatest hits, was released in 2017 as his first release in the United States. In a review for Pitchfork, Kevin Lozano gave the EP a score of 7.7 out of 10.

In 2023, MC Bin Laden featured on the Gorillaz track "Controllah", a bonus track from the deluxe version of their album Cracker Island.

Personal life 
MC Bin Laden is an evangelical Christian.

References

Living people
Singers from São Paulo
Brazilian funk singers
Brazilian evangelicals
Year of birth missing (living people)